Nine teams competed in the 2014–15 Dutch Basketball League.

Note
As of 14 December 2014.

squads